Koso is a Angami Naga surname in Nagaland. It is a family name of the Yeri-mi clan from Viswema. The descendants are referred to as Kosonümiko.

Notable people 
 Viseyie Koso (b. 1984), Sportsperson
 Vizol Koso (1914–2008), First Naga pilot (Royal Indian Air Force during World War II) and Chief Minister of Nagaland (1974–1975; 1977–1980)

See also 
Koso (disambiguation) (other meanings)

References 

Surnames of Naga origin
Naga-language surnames